Darder is a surname. Notable people with the surname include:

Antonia Darder (born 1952), Puerto Rican academic, artist, poet, and activist
Sergi Darder (born 1993), Spanish footballer

See also
Harder (surname)